The 2012 Queen Elisabeth Music Competition is the competition's 50th edition, comprising its 17th Eugène Ysaÿe Violin Competition and its 19th Composition Competition. 

The violin competition took place between 30 April and 26 May 2012 in Brussels' Centre for Fine Arts. Andrey Baranov won it to become the first Russian violinist to do so since the collapse of the Soviet Union, while Tatsuki Narita and Su-shin Hyun were awarded the silver and bronze medals.

Violin competition

Jury
  Arie van Lysebeth (chairman)
  Pierre Amoyal
  Augustin Dumay
  Patrice Fontanarosa
  Daniel Hope
  Hu Nai-yuan
  Lewis Kaplan
  Kim Min
  Philippe Koch
  Shirly Laub
  Mihaela Martin
  Natalia Prischepenko
  Tatiana Samouil
  Akiko Suwanai
  Vera Tsu Weiling

Results

References

External links
 Official website

Queen Elisabeth Competition
April 2012 events in Europe
May 2012 events in Europe
2012 in Belgium
2012 in Brussels